HMS Bacchus was a British Royal Navy  launched in 1813 and expended as a breakwater in 1829. In between, she recaptured or captured a number of small merchant vessels.

Career
In May 1813 Commander Lewis Hole commissioned Bacchus for the Cork station. The convoy had been out 27 days.

On 29 October, the French privateer schooner Ravenant, of four guns and 160 men, captured two vessels off The Lizard: Mermaid, Kelly, master, sailing from Liverpool to Falmouth, and Moston, M. Millan, master, sailing from Newfoundland to Cork. Bacchus recaptured both vessels and sent them in, Mermaid to Plymouth and Moston to Dartmouth.

Hole received promotion to post captain on 4 December 1813, but remained on Bacchus until February 1814. Commander George Wickens Willes replaced Hole.

The American privateer Grand Turk captured Catherine, Brown, master, on 11 April as Catherine was sailing from Lisbon to London. Bacchus recaptured Catherine, only to have Grand Turk recapture her on 28 April and burn her.

In May Commander William Slaughter replaced Willes, but in June Commander William Hill replaced Slaughter. (Willes received promotion to post captain on 7 June 1814.) On 3 September Bacchus grounded on the shore of the back of Spike Island, near Cork.

In December 1816 Commander Edward Barnard replaced Hill. In July 1817, Commander John Parkin replaced Barnard.

Fate
Bacchus was laid up at Deptford in January 1820. She then in August 1826 was fitted to receive coals. On 22 September 1828, the "Principal Officers and Commissioners of His Majesty's Navy" offered "Bacchus brig, of 384 tons", lying at Deptford, for sale. She failed to sell so between June and August 1829 she underwent fitting for service as a breakwater at Harwich. She was towed there on 13 August 1829.

She was still in place in 1845.

Citations

References
 
 Commission (1845) Report of the Commissioners Upon the Subject of Harbours of Refuge: Presented to the House of Commons, in Pursuance of an Address, . Great Britain. Commission on Harbours of Refuge. (W. Clowes and Sons).
 

1813 ships
Brig-sloops of the Royal Navy
Cruizer-class brig-sloops
Ships sunk as breakwaters